Streptomyces albus is a bacterial species from which the pseudodisaccharide aminoglycoside salbostatin was isolated.  S. albus is known to produce white aerial mycelium.

References

Further reading

External links
Type strain of Streptomyces albus at BacDive -  the Bacterial Diversity Metadatabase

albus